The Urban Air Samba is a Czech designed and built light aircraft of the 1990s which incorporates composite construction. It remained in series production in 2017.

Production of the Urban Air's designs, including the Samba, was taken up by Distar Air of Ústí nad Orlicí, Czech Republic in about 2010.

Development

Urban Air SPO designed and built their first model, the two-seat side-by-side Urban Air UFM-13 Lambada, which first flew in 1996. From their original model, they developed the UFM-10 Samba which was of similar overall design, using all-composite construction. The wings were reduced in span and a conventional tail unit was incorporated in place of the 'T' layout of the Lambada. The earlier tailwheel undercarriage was replaced by a fixed tricycle layout.

The Samba XXL is a further development, introduced in 2003 for the Fédération Aéronautique Internationale microlight category, with a modified fuselage providing a larger and repositioned cockpit canopy, modified engine cowling and a more streamlined tail unit.

Variants
Airo 5
Licensed version produced by Airo Aviation, Ras Al Khaimah Free Trade Zone, United Arab Emirates.

Specifications (Samba XXL)

References
Notes

Bibliography

External links

 Official website

1990s Czech and Czechoslovakian civil utility aircraft
Distar Air aircraft
Airo Aviation aircraft
Single-engined tractor aircraft
Aircraft first flown in 1999
Low-wing aircraft